Michael Swift (born March 26, 1987) is a Canadian-born South Korean professional ice hockey player who is currently playing for the Daemyung Killer Whales in the Asia League Ice Hockey (ALIH). He was a member of Korea's 2018 Winter Olympics team.

Professional career
On April 19, 2008, he was signed as a free agent by the  New Jersey Devils. During the 2010–11 season, he was traded to the San Jose Sharks along with Patrick Davis in exchange for Steven Zalewski and Jay Leach. He finished the season with the Sharks AHL affiliate, the Worcester Sharks.

High1
On August 4, 2011, Swift unconventionally signed in the Asian League with High1. During the 2011–12 season, he was named as the League's MVP after scoring 90 points in just 36 games.

As of 2015–16 season, he's the team's all-time leader, with most Goals scored, most Assists  and Points accumulated.

Career statistics

Regular season and playoffs

International

Records
High1
Team all-time leader for Most Goals
Team all-time leader for Most Assists
Team all-time leader for Most Points
First player in team history to score 100 Goals 
First player in team history to record 100 Assists and 100 Goals 
First player in team history to record 200 Points
First player in team history to record 200 Assists and 150 Goals 
First player in team history to record 300 Points
First player in team history to record 400 Points

Asia League Ice Hockey
Fastest player in Asia league history to reach 100 Goals scored(90 games)
Highest points per game ratio during career, with 2.34(as of 13/14)

Awards and honours

Asia League Ice Hockey
2011–2012 ALH season:
Asia League Best Plus/Minus (+52)
Asia League Most Assists (46)
Asia League Most Goals (44)
Asia League Most Points (90)
Asia League Regular Season MVP
2012–2013 ALH season: 	
Asia League Most Assists (58)
Asia League Most Goals (39)
Asia League Most Points (97)
2013–2014 ALH season: 	
Asia League Most Goals (37)
Asia League Most Points (67)
2014–2015 ALH season: 	
Asia League Most Points (80)
2015–2016 ALH season: 	
Asia League Most Points (70)

References

External links

1987 births
Living people
Albany Devils players
Canadian ice hockey centres
Sportspeople from Peterborough, Ontario
Laredo Bucks players
Lowell Devils players
Mississauga IceDogs players
Niagara IceDogs players
South Korean ice hockey centres
Canadian emigrants to South Korea
Worcester Sharks players
Ice hockey people from Ontario
Asian Games silver medalists for South Korea
Medalists at the 2017 Asian Winter Games
Asian Games medalists in ice hockey
Ice hockey players at the 2017 Asian Winter Games
High1 players
Olympic ice hockey players of South Korea
Ice hockey players at the 2018 Winter Olympics
Canadian expatriate ice hockey players in South Korea
Canadian expatriate ice hockey players in the United States
Naturalized citizens of South Korea